Harris Grade is a post-hardcore band from Hollywood, California, established in 2005.

Album
In 2010, the band self-released their album, Lipstick Politics, at The Troubadour in West Hollywood. The album received a positive review from Behind the Hype.

The band released a music video for the title track that featured cameos from Max Green of Escape the Fate, and Jewel Shepard from The Return of the Living Dead.

Touring

In 2010 Harris Grade earned a spot on the Pomona, California date of the Warped Tour 2010 through the Ernie Ball Battle of the Bands.

Members
Current
Robyn August Reinstadler  - lead vocals, lyrics
Caleb Healey - lead guitar
Alex von Hollen - guitar
Jason Friday - bass, backing vocals
Greg Fulleman - drums

Discography

Videography
 Lipstick Politics (2010)

References

External links
Official Myspace Page
Official Facebook Page

Musical groups from Los Angeles
American post-hardcore musical groups
Rock music groups from California
Musical groups established in 2005